Armah Ayo Vaikainah (born 17 June 1995) is a Liberian professional footballer who last played for Thai side Customs Ladkrabang United. He has also played for the Liberia national team.

References 

1995 births
Living people
Liberian footballers
Association football midfielders
LISCR FC players
Armah Vaikainah
Liberian First Division players
Armah Vaikainah
Liberia international footballers
Liberian expatriate footballers
Expatriate footballers in Thailand
Liberian expatriate sportspeople in Thailand